John Horsley Russell Davis FBA FRAI (born London, England, 9 September 1938; died 15 January 2017) was a British anthropologist, ex-Warden of All Souls College, Oxford, and Professor of Social Anthropology in the University of Oxford.

Education
Davis was educated at University College, Oxford (BA Modern History 1961, MA) and the London School of Economics (PhD Social Anthropology 1968).

Career
He was elected a Fellow of the British Academy in 1988.

He was appointed Professor of Social Anthropology in the University of Oxford and Fellow of All Souls College, Oxford in 1990 and was elected Warden of All Souls in 1995 (until 2008).

He was Chairman of the European Association of Social Anthropologists 1993/94 and President of the Royal Anthropological Institute from 1997 until 2001.

He nominated his immediate predecessor as Warden, Patrick Neill, Baron Neill of Bladen, for the office of Chancellor of the University of Oxford.

Principal Publications
 (1973) Land and family in Pisticci
 (1987) Libyan politics: tribe and revolution
 (1992) Exchange

References

External links
All Souls College, Oxford all-souls.ox.ac.uk
British Academy britac.ac.uk
John Davis at "Pioneers of Qualitative Research" from the Economic and social Data Service

1938 births
2017 deaths
Alumni of the London School of Economics
Alumni of University College, Oxford
English historians
Fellows of All Souls College, Oxford
Fellows of the British Academy
Wardens of All Souls College, Oxford
Writers from London
People from Oxford
Religion academics
British anthropologists
English male non-fiction writers
Fellows of the Royal Anthropological Institute of Great Britain and Ireland
Presidents of the Royal Anthropological Institute of Great Britain and Ireland